This was the eleventh edition of LOS40 Music Awards (formerly Los Premios 40 Principales), the annual music awards organized by Spanish radio Los 40. It was held on December 1, 2016, on Barcelona's Palau Sant Jordi, marking the first time the ceremony does not take place in Madrid. The nominations, alongside the new design of the awards, were revealed on October 5, 2016.

Performances

Awards and nominations

Artist of the Year
 Manuel Carrasco
 Enrique Iglesias
 Fangoria
 Leiva
 Dani Martín

New Artist of the Year
 Furious Monkey House
 Nelou
 Ana Mena
 Morat
 Marlon

Album of the Year
 Leiva - Monstruos
 Love of Lesbian - El poeta Halley
 Manuel Carrasco - Bailar el viento
 Dani Martín - La montaña rusa
 Fangoria - Canciones para robots románticos

Song of the Year
 Enrique Iglesias feat. Wisin - Duele el corazón
 Pablo López feat. Juanes - Tu enemigo
 Fangoria - Geometría polisentimental
 Manuel Carrasco - Yo quiero vivir
 Morat - Cómo te atreves

Video of the Year
 Enrique Iglesias feat. Wisin - Duele el corazón
 Miss Caffeina - Mira cómo vuelo
 Juan Magan feat. Luciana - Baila conmigo
 Dani Martín - Las ganas
 Leiva - Sincericidio

International Artist of the Year
 Justin Bieber
 Coldplay
 Sia
 Adele
 Jennifer Lopez

International New Artist of the Year
 The Chainsmokers
 Drake
 Twenty One Pilots
 Lukas Graham
 Kungs

International Album of the Year
 Justin Bieber - Purpose
 Sia - This Is Acting
 Drake - Views
 Coldplay - A Head Full of Dreams
 Adele - 25

International Song of the Year
 Justin Bieber - Sorry
 Sia ft. Sean Paul - Cheap Thrills
 Adele - Hello
 Jennifer Lopez - Ain't Your Mama
 Drake ft. Wizkid & Kyla - One Dance

International Video of the Year
 OneRepublic - Wherever I Go
 David Guetta ft. Sia - Bang My Head
 Jennifer Lopez - Ain't Your Mama
 Coldplay - Up & Up
 Naughty Boy ft. Beyoncé - RunninBest Latin Artist
 Juanes
 Carlos Vives
 J Balvin Maná
 Maluma

Tour of the Year
 Adele - Live 2016
 Coldplay - A Head Full of Dreams Tour
 Beyoncé - Formation World Tour
 U2 - Innocence + Experience Tour
 Manuel Carrasco - Gira Bailar el vientoCritic Award
 Love of Lesbian Michael Kiwanuka Leiva
 Frank Ocean
 El Guincho

Impactful Festival Act
 Love of Lesbian Miss Caffeina
 Sidonie
 Supersubmarina
 Sidecars

50th Anniversary Golden Music Awards
On occasion of the 50th anniversary of Los 40, seven artists were awarded honorary awards to their respective careers. The following is the list of the recipients:
 Robbie Williams
 Juanes
 Miguel Bosé
 Maná
 Shakira
 Fangoria
 Michael Bublé
 Carlos Vives & Shakira - La bicicleta

Lo + 40 Artist Award
 Jason Derulo Sweet California
 Justin Bieber
 David Guetta
 Morat

Global Show Award
 J Balvin - Ginza
 Maluma - Borro cassette'' Carlos Vives & Shakira - La bicicleta
 Nicky Jam - Hasta el amanecer
 Enrique Iglesias feat. Wisin - Duele el corazón

Influencer of the Year
 ElRubius
 Sr. Cheeto
 Chusita
 Jorge Cremades'''
 Germán

References

Los Premios 40 Principales
2016 music awards
2016 in Spanish music